Robert L. Marks (born January 11, 1932), was an American politician who was a member of the Montana House of Representatives.

Marks, a Republican, resided in Clancy, Montana and served from 1969 to 1989. He was Minority Leader in 1977 and 1983, Speaker pro tempore in 1985, and Speaker of the House in 1981 and 1987. He is an alumnus of the University of Montana and Montana State University.

References

1932 births
Living people
Republican Party members of the Montana House of Representatives
Politicians from Helena, Montana
People from Jefferson County, Montana
University of Montana alumni
Montana State University alumni
Speakers of the Montana House of Representatives